Ar Horqin Banner (Mongolian:    Aru Qorčin qosiɣu) is a banner of eastern Inner Mongolia, People's Republic of China. The banner lies on China National Highway 303, running from Ji'an, Jilin to Xilinhot, Inner Mongolia. The Mongolian dialect spoken in Ar Khorchin is not Khorchin, as the name suggests, but Baarin.

Climate

References

www.xzqh.org 

Banners of Inner Mongolia
Chifeng